Khalid Hameed, Baron Hameed, CBE, DL (born 1 July 1941) is the chairman of Alpha Hospital Group, and chairman and chief executive officer of the London International Hospital. Prior to this, he was the Executive Director & Chief Executive Officer of the Cromwell Hospital in London. He hails from Lucknow, India.

He chairs the Commonwealth Youth Exchange Council. He is a board member of the British Muslim Research Centre, and also the Ethnic Minorities Foundation. He is an executive member of the Maimonides Foundation and a trustee of The Little Foundation. He received a CBE in the 2004 New Year's Honours. Dr Hameed supports various charities and was awarded the Sternberg Award for 2005 for his contribution to further Christian - Muslim - Jewish Relations. He has received several national and international honours from various countries including the United Kingdom. He is a governor of International Students House; president of The Little Foundation; chairman of The Woolf Institute of Abrahamic Faiths, and is a vice-president of the Friends of the British Library.

He is involved with inter-religious matters and lectures on this subject.

He was appointed by Her Majesty the Queen as the first Asian High Sheriff of Greater London for the year 2006–2007. The office of High sheriff is 1,000 years old and is the second oldest office in the country after the monarchy.

In February 2007, it was announced by the House of Lords Appointments Commission that he will be made a life peer and will sit as a Crossbencher. The peerage was gazetted on 27 March 2007 as Baron Hameed, of Hampstead in the London Borough of Camden.
He was also named British Asian of the year 2007.

He was awarded Padma Shri in 1992 and the Padma Bhushan, "third in hierarchy of civilian awards", by the Government of India in 2009. He was the chief guest at Pravasi Bharatiya Diwas 2010 held in New Delhi.

He is married to Dr Ghazala Afzal, who was appointed High Sheriff of Greater London for 2015–16.

Arms

Notes

References

Living people
Commanders of the Order of the British Empire
People's peers
Deputy Lieutenants of Greater London
Scientists from Lucknow
Recipients of the Padma Bhushan in medicine
Indian emigrants to England
High Sheriffs of Greater London
Crossbench life peers
Recipients of the Padma Shri in medicine
British politicians of Indian descent
1941 births
20th-century Indian medical doctors
Businesspeople from Lucknow
Naturalised citizens of the United Kingdom
Life peers created by Elizabeth II